Willem Lagendaal (13 April 1909 – 6 March 1987) was a Dutch football forward who played for Netherlands in the 1934 FIFA World Cup. He also played for XerxesDZB.

References

External links
 FIFA profile

1909 births
1987 deaths
Dutch footballers
Netherlands international footballers
Association football forwards
XerxesDZB players
1934 FIFA World Cup players
Footballers from Rotterdam